Benjamin Paul Amos (born 10 April 1990) is an English professional footballer who plays as a goalkeeper for Wigan Athletic. Born in Macclesfield, Cheshire, Amos began his career with Crewe Alexandra's youth academy, but joined Manchester United at the age of 11. He has also played for Bolton Wanderers and has spent time on loan at Peterborough United, Molde, and Oldham Athletic. Additionally, Amos is an England youth international, having represented his country at every level from Under-16 to Under-21.

Club career

Crewe Alexandra
Amos was born in Macclesfield, Cheshire and was a member of the Crewe Alexandra academy until he was released at the age of 10. While at Crewe, he also played for another local team, Bollington United, as a centre midfielder. One year later, Amos was playing for his local team against the team at the top of the table, and they needed to win the match to win the league. Amos' team's goalkeeper was injured during the game, and as the tallest on the team, Amos was put in goal; however, he had also been the team's regular penalty taker all season, so when they were awarded a penalty, he went all the way up the pitch to take the kick. He scored, and his team went on to win the game 3–2, together with the league title. After the game, his parents told him that a Manchester United scout had been watching him and that he had been invited for trials. Amos joined Manchester United at the age of 11.

Manchester United
In his first season at Manchester United, Amos became a regular starter for the club's Under-13 team, playing in 19 out of 27 matches in the 2001–02 season. Amos was named as an unused substitute for the Under-18 side for the first time on 8 January 2005, for a league game against Manchester City. His first appearance for the Under-18s came exactly nine months later, on 8 October 2005, coming on as a substitute for Danny Rose after starting goalkeeper Ron-Robert Zieler was sent off in a 2–0 defeat to Bolton Wanderers. He was regularly named as an unused substitute during the 2005–06 season – including for two reserve team matches – but became a frequent starter for the Under-18s in 2006–07 after signing a trainee contract in July 2006. However, he missed the final of the 2006–07 FA Youth Cup with a dislocated shoulder.

He retained his place in the Under-18 team for 2007–08, in addition to making his debut for the reserve team against Wigan Athletic on 7 November 2007, and during the season he impressed enough to be selected to go on the first-team's 2008 summer tour of South Africa. Amos was named as a substitute for all three matches of the tour, but did not play. En route back from South Africa, United stopped off in Nigeria to play against Portsmouth on 27 July 2008, with Amos replacing Tomasz Kuszczak after 76 minutes. He made his competitive first-team debut on 23 September 2008 in a 3–1 win at home to Middlesbrough in the third round of the League Cup. On 14 December 2008, Amos travelled to Japan with the Manchester United squad for the 2008 FIFA Club World Cup, having been called up as a late replacement for Ben Foster, who had suffered a hand injury while training.

Loans to Peterborough and Molde
On 29 October 2009, Amos signed for the Championship team Peterborough United on a month's loan as cover for Peterborough's suspended first-choice goalkeeper Joe Lewis. He made his only appearance on 31 October in a 2–1 defeat against Barnsley. After returning to Manchester United, Amos was again sent out on loan in March 2010, this time to Norwegian side Molde FK, where he remained on loan until 30 June 2010.

Return to Manchester United
Following the departure of Ben Foster from Manchester United to Birmingham City, United manager Alex Ferguson declared that Amos would be Manchester United's third-choice goalkeeper for the 2010–11 season behind Edwin van der Sar and Tomasz Kuszczak. He made his first appearance of the season on 26 October 2010, starting in goal for United's 3–2 win over Wolverhampton Wanderers in the fourth round of the League Cup.

In United's final Champions League group match on 7 December 2010, Amos was picked to start against Valencia at Old Trafford. Pablo Hernández scored Valencia's only goal past him after 32 minutes of the match – the first goal United had conceded in the Champions League that season – as the two sides played out a 1–1 draw.

Loan to Oldham Athletic
With the signing of Danish goalkeeper Anders Lindegaard, Manchester United allowed Amos to join Oldham Athletic on loan for the remainder of the season on 7 January 2011, although he would continue to train with Manchester United once a week. He made his debut against Swindon Town the next day and kept a clean sheet. However, three days later, he conceded all six goals in a 6–0 defeat at home to Southampton; he allowed Adam Lallana's 20-yard shot underneath his body for the second goal, and he was rounded by Lee Barnard for the sixth.

On 15 March 2011, Lindegaard was ruled out for five weeks following a knee injury, so Amos was recalled from Oldham to cover for Edwin van der Sar and Tomasz Kuszczak.

Return to Manchester United

Amos made his first start of the 2011–12 season in a third round League Cup tie at Elland Road against Leeds United. He kept a clean sheet as United cruised through to the next round winning 3–0. He played again in the following round away at Aldershot Town, a game which United also won 3–0 and advanced to the quarter finals. He was in goal again for United's League Cup game in a defeat against Championship club Crystal Palace on 30 November. It also seemed that he had moved above last season's second choice Tomasz Kuszczak in the pecking order, but was now third choice behind Anders Lindegaard and David de Gea. He made his first Premier League start in a 2–0 home win against Stoke City on 31 January 2012, keeping a clean sheet on his debut.

On 30 May 2012, Amos signed a three-year contract extension with Manchester United, which kept him at the club until 2015.

Loan to Hull City

On 31 July 2012, Amos joined Championship team Hull City on a season-long loan from Manchester United. Before the loan deal was completed, he had joined Hull on their pre-season training camp in Portugal. He made his debut on 11 August 2012 in 7–6 penalty shoot-out victory over Rotherham United in the first round of the 2012–13 Football League Cup. However, after 19 appearances, including two in the League Cup, Amos returned to Manchester United on 3 January 2013.

Loan to Carlisle United
On 15 November 2013, Amos joined League One team Carlisle United on a month-long loan from Manchester United.

Loan to Bolton Wanderers
On 30 January 2015 he joined Championship club Bolton Wanderers on a month's loan to provide competition for Andy Lonergan after Ádám Bogdán was ruled out with an ankle injury picked up in training. On 21 February 2015 he made his Bolton debut as a substitute for the injured Lonergan as Wanderers lost 4–1 to Nottingham Forest at the City Ground. He played nine Championship games for Bolton before his loan expired on 4 April.

Return to Manchester United
Ben Amos returned to Manchester United after his loan spell at Bolton Wanderers, but on 10 June 2015, it was announced on Manchester United website that Ben Amos has been released from the club along with four other players.

Bolton Wanderers
On 1 July 2015, Amos returned to Bolton Wanderers following his release from Manchester United, signing a four-year contract with the club. He returned to the starting line up for Bolton on the opening day against Derby County. He went onto make 44 appearances as Bolton were relegated to third tier.

Loan to Cardiff City
After finding himself second choice behind summer signing, Mark Howard, Amos signed a season long loan at Championship side, Cardiff City on 26 August. He was kept out of the starting line-up by Ben Wilson, until 17 September, where he made his debut against Leeds United. He remained first choice until December, eventually losing his place in the side to loanee Allan McGregor.

Loan to Charlton Athletic
On 29 July 2017, Amos joined League One side Charlton Athletic on loan for the 2017–18 season.

Loan to Millwall
On 13 July 2018, Amos was signed by Championship side Millwall, joining the club for the 2018–19 season.

Charlton Athletic
On 15 July 2019, Amos returned to Charlton Athletic on a two-year deal. In his first season, Amos was limited to one League Cup appearance, as he was second choice behind Dillon Phillips. After Phillips was sold to Cardiff, Amos played every minute of every league game for Charlton in their 2020/21 League One campaign, as they narrowly missed out on the play-offs. Amos kept 17 clean sheets across the season.

Wigan Athletic
Having been out of contract at Charlton, Amos agreed a two-year deal at Wigan Athletic on 28 June 2021.

International career
Amos is an England youth international, having played for his country at the Under-16, Under-17, Under-18, Under-19, Under-20 and Under-21 levels. He was called up to the Under-21 squad in 2011 for their friendly match against Iceland, but he was an unused substitute.

Amos was included on the 80-man shortlist for the Great Britain Olympic football team squad for the 2012 Summer Olympics, but did not make the final 18.

Personal life
Amos attended Fallibroome High School, where he earned 11 GCSEs at grade C or above.

Career statistics

Honours
Manchester United
FIFA Club World Cup: 2008
League Cup: 2008–09

Wigan Athletic
EFL League One: 2021–22

References

External links

Profile at StretfordEnd.co.uk

1990 births
Living people
Sportspeople from Macclesfield
English footballers
England youth international footballers
England under-21 international footballers
Association football goalkeepers
Crewe Alexandra F.C. players
Manchester United F.C. players
Peterborough United F.C. players
Molde FK players
Oldham Athletic A.F.C. players
Hull City A.F.C. players
Carlisle United F.C. players
Bolton Wanderers F.C. players
Cardiff City F.C. players
Charlton Athletic F.C. players
Millwall F.C. players
Wigan Athletic F.C. players
Premier League players
English Football League players
Eliteserien players
English expatriate footballers
Expatriate footballers in Norway